Deh-e Pakel Allah Reza (also Romanized as Deh-e Pākel Allah Rez̤ā) is a village in Dehdasht-e Sharqi Rural District, in the Central District of Kohgiluyeh County, Kohgiluyeh and Boyer-Ahmad Province, Iran. At the 2006 census, its population was 139, in 27 families.

References 

Populated places in Kohgiluyeh County